Herman Mandui (1969 – October 4, 2014) was a Papua New Guinean archaeologist. He served as the Chief Archaeologist of Papua New Guinea starting in 2008 until his death in 2014. He has been regarded as a "pioneer of archeological research" in Papua New Guinea, having worked on such sites as the Kuk Swamp in Western Highlands Province and the early human settlement sites in the Ivane Valley of the Goilala District.

References

1969 births
2014 deaths
Papua New Guinean archaeologists
University of Papua New Guinea alumni
People from the Southern Highlands Province